MBC Persia is a free-to-air television channel owned by the Saudi media conglomerate MBC Group that shows movies and television series. Programs are subtitled in Persian.

References
 

Movie channels
Persian-language television stations
Television channels and stations established in 2008
Middle East Broadcasting Center